Belicenochrus is a genus of hubbardiid short-tailed whipscorpions, first described by Armas & Víquez in 2010.

Species 
, the World Schizomida Catalog accepts the following two species:

 Belicenochrus peckorum Armas & Víquez, 2010 – Belize
 Belicenochrus pentalatus Armas & Víquez, 2010 – Belize

References 

Schizomida genera
Schizomida
Taxa described in 2010